Oleg Petrov (born May 29, 1968) is a retired Russian professional footballer.

External links
 
 

1968 births
Living people
Soviet footballers
Russian footballers
Russian expatriate footballers
Expatriate footballers in Ukraine
Russian expatriate sportspeople in Ukraine
Expatriate footballers in Germany
Ukrainian Premier League players
Ukrainian First League players
FC Asmaral Moscow players
NK Veres Rivne players
FC Fakel Voronezh players
Association football midfielders
FC FShM Torpedo Moscow players